Helene "Lena" Asmus  (born 5 May 1982 in Omsk) is a Russian and German rhythmic gymnast.

Asmus competed for Germany in the rhythmic gymnastics individual all-around competition at the 2000 Summer Olympics in Sydney. There she was 17th in the qualification and didn't advance to the final of 10 competitors.

References

External links 
 

1982 births
Living people
Russian rhythmic gymnasts
German rhythmic gymnasts
Gymnasts at the 2000 Summer Olympics
Olympic gymnasts of Germany
Sportspeople from Omsk